Cosmopterix feminella is a moth in the family Cosmopterigidae. It was described by Sinev in 1988. It is found in the Russian Far East (Primorye).

References

Natural History Museum Lepidoptera generic names catalog

Moths described in 1988
feminella